Levy's may refer to:

Henry S. Levy and Sons, a former bakery in Brooklyn
Levy's (department store), a former department store chain in Arizona